Nirdhi Bhil or sometimes pronounced as Nilde Bhil are a Muslimcommunity found mainly at the base of the Satmalas hills in the Jamner and Pachora subdivisions of Jalgaon District in Maharashtra, India. They are Adivasi, being one of the main sub-groups within the larger Bhil tribe. Their customs are similar to other Muslim Bhil sub-groups, and there are cases of intermarriage between the two groups. However, the two groups are geographically divided. Little is known as to the exact circumstances as to their conversion to Islam, but like the some bhil, it is said to have occurred during the rule of the Faruki kings. Satmalas hills formed part of the territory the Faruqi kingdom, a medieval state in central India. A close association had developed between the Bhil of this region, and the Faruqi state led to the conversion of many of them to Islam.

The community are mainly small and medium-sized farmers, with livestock raising as an important subsidiary occupation. Most Nirdhi now speak Marathi, but historically the community spoke its own dialect of the Bhil language.

References

Bhil
Social groups of Maharashtra
Muslim communities of India
Scheduled Tribes of India
Muslim communities of Maharashtra